The car crash song emerged as a popular pop and rock music teenage tragedy song during the 1950s and 1960s at a time when the number of people being killed in vehicle collisions was rising rapidly in many countries. In the United Kingdom, the number of fatalities on UK roads rose to a peace-time peak of 7,985 in 1966 before then falling to a new low of 2,222 in 2009. The theme also appears in country and other music styles.

See also
 List of road accidents
 List of people who died in road accidents

References

 
Lists of songs about a topic
Lists of transport accidents and incidents